Nan H. Rich (born February 9, 1942) is an American politician from the state of Florida and currently serves as a county commissioner in Broward County, Florida.

Career 
She served as a Democratic member of the Florida Senate from 2004 to 2012. Rich served as Senate Minority Leader from 2010 to 2012 and was term-limited out of the Senate in 2012. She served in the Florida House of Representatives from 2000 to 2004.

She was a candidate for Governor of Florida in 2014, but lost the Democratic primary to Charlie Crist, who garnered 74 percent of the vote. Rich received endorsements from both the Florida NOW and NOW as well as Buddy MacKay, the most recent Democratic governor of Florida.

President Bill Clinton appointed Rich to the Board of the United States Holocaust Memorial Museum in Washington, D.C. Rich served as president of the National Council of Jewish Women (1996-1999).

Personal life 
Rich attended the University of Florida, where she was a member of Alpha Epsilon Phi sorority.

References

External links
- NanRich2014 official campaign website
Project Vote Smart - Senator Nan H. Rich (FL) profile
Follow the Money - Nan H Rich
2006 2004 2002 2000 campaign contributions

|-

|-

1942 births
Democratic Party Florida state senators
Living people
Jewish American state legislators in Florida
Democratic Party members of the Florida House of Representatives
University of Florida alumni
Women state legislators in Florida
Presidents of the National Council of Jewish Women
21st-century American Jews
21st-century American women